Lovefreekz is the alias of English electronic record producer Mark Hadfield. In 2004 his single "Shine", re-creating a sample of the Electric Light Orchestra's 1979 track "Shine a Little Love", became an international club hit, reaching number 22 on the Billboard Hot Dance Airplay chart in its 2 April 2005 issue during its four-week run. The single was also featured in episode five of series one of How I Met Your Mother in a scene where Marshall is dancing to the song in a nightclub. The track also reached Number 6 in the UK Singles Chart.

Discography

Singles

References

Lovefreekz
Lovefreekz
English dance musicians
Living people
Year of birth missing (living people)